"Fascination" is a popular waltz song with music (1904) by Fermo Dante Marchetti and lyrics (1905) by Maurice de Féraudy.

It was first published in Hamburg (Anton J. Benjamin) and Paris (Édition F. D. Marchetti) in 1904 in a version for piano solo ('Valse Tzigane'). As a song with de Féraudy's words, it was first performed by the French music-hall singer Paulette Darty, in 1905, and published the same year.

Recordings

With its English lyrics, by Dick Manning, "Fascination" was recorded by diverse artists including: Dick Jacobs, Nat King Cole and David Carroll, all of whose versions made the charts.

In 1957, two of the more popular recordings of "Fascination" were released, Dinah Shore went to number 15 on the Billboard Most Played By Jockeys chart, while a recording by Jane Morgan was released by Kapp Records as catalog number 191, which proved to become her signature song. It first reached the Billboard magazine charts on 9 September 1957. On the Disk Jockey chart, it peaked at number 7; on the Best Seller chart, at number 12; on the composite chart of the top 100 songs, it reached number 11. Brazilian singer Elis Regina, for CBD Phonogram / Philips (1970–1980).

The original French words 
Je t'ai rencontré simplement
Et tu n'as rien fait pour chercher à me plaire
Je t'aime pourtant
D'un amour ardent
Dont rien, je le sens, ne pourra me défaire.
Tu seras toujours mon amant
Et je crois en toi comme au bonheur suprême.
Je te fuis parfois, mais je reviens quand même
C'est plus fort que moi… je t'aime !

Lorsque je souffre, il me faut tes yeux
Profonds et joyeux
Afin que j'y meure,
Et j'ai besoin pour revivre, amour,
De t'avoir un jour
Moins qu'un jour, une heure,
De me bercer un peu dans tes bras
Quand mon cœur est las,
Quand parfois je pleure.
Ah ! crois-le bien, mon chéri, mon aimé, mon roi,
Je n'ai de bonheur qu'avec toi.

Song in other media
La dame de chez Maxim's (1933 Alexander Korda film), sung by Florelle (Odette Rousseau) as La Môme Crevette
In the 1933 film The House on 56th Street, starring Kay Francis.
On the soundtrack of the 1946 film, The Diary of a Chambermaid, starring Paulette Goddard.
The theme was used prominently in the 1949 film Gigi directed by Jacqueline Audry.
It was also popularized in the 1955 movie The Grand Maneuver by René Clair.  
Its popularity increased when used in the 1957 movie Love in the Afternoon directed by Billy Wilder.
It has been featured on General Hospital numerous times, usually during Luke and Laura scenes.
A faster-tempo version of this song featured in the first two Karate Kid films.  Once during the scene at the country club, where Ali and Johnny are dancing together, the second occasion in Part II, when Daniel and Miyagi are in the car with Chozen, and Chozen dials the radio to a station that plays this same song. In The Next Karate Kid, Miyagi teaches Julie to dance to a vocal version of the song.
An instrumental version of the song is heard in the episode "Elegy" of The Twilight Zone.
Fascination was heard in Disney's Herbie Goes to Monte Carlo (1977), in the scene where Herbie plays it on his radio, to the Lancia Scorpion later named "Giselle".
"Fascination" was sung in the 2007 French film La Vie en rose (La Môme), by Maya Barsony, and is featured on the soundtrack.
The first episode of the HBO series Boardwalk Empire featured an instrumental version of "Fascination".
 Frequently throughout the soundtrack of the 1942 film Le Mariage de Chiffon, directed by Claude Autant-Lara.
 The Nat King Cole version was featured in the 2006 film Take The Lead.
 A Spanish-language recording by Trio Los Panchos was heard in the 2019, Las Estrellas series Silvia Pinal, frente a ti.

References

French songs
1905 songs
Nat King Cole songs
Jane Morgan songs
Waltzes
Songs written by Dick Manning